Maya is a 1966 Metrocolor/Panavision American coming-of-age story drama about a young man in the jungles of India. The film was directed by John Berry and stars Clint Walker, Jay North and Sajid Khan. Italian composer Riz Ortolani, creator of the soundtrack for Mondo Cane and Pupi Avati's films, provided the musical score.

Plot
Fourteen-year-old Terry Bowen travels from the U.S. to India to meet his father Hugh Bowen for the first time. After a dispute with his father, Terry runs away and is befriended by Raji. Together, Terry and Raji have many adventures in the jungles of India. The cultural and religious differences between Terry, an American Christian, and Raji, an Indian Hindu, cause conflict. However, the boys overcome their differences and survive to deliver Maya, a sacred white elephant, and her calf to a far away temple.

Cast
 Clint Walker as Hugh Bowen
 Jay North as Terry Bowen
 Sajid Khan as Raji
 I. S. Johar as One-Eye
 P. Jairaj as Gammu Ghat
 Nana Palsikar as Raji's Father
 Uma Rao as One Eye's Daughter
 Madhusdan Pathak as Station Master
 Sonia Sahni as Sheela

Adaptations 
A television series based on the film aired on NBC during the 1967–1968 season for 18 episodes. Sajid Khan and Jay North reprised their roles. The series presented a retroactive continuity of the original film premise. In the series, Terry Bowen, approximately a year older than he is in the film, arrives in India to reunite with his father, who he soon learns is missing and presumed to have been killed by a tiger. Facing deportation back to the United States, Terry escapes the authorities and meets orphaned runaway Raji and his pet elephant Maya. The boys search for Terry's father, whom Terry hopes is still alive. Over the course of the series, the two boys and the elephant continue their search but never find Terry's father.

The film was adapted as a Dell comic book, also titled Maya, in December 1966.

See also
List of American films of 1966

References

External links 

 
 Jalal din https://www.imdb.com/name/nm0227499/bio
 
 
 

1966 films
Films set in India
Films scored by Riz Ortolani
Metro-Goldwyn-Mayer films
Films adapted into television shows
Films based on Pakistani novels
American drama films
1966 drama films
Films adapted into comics
Films about elephants
1960s English-language films
Films directed by John Berry
1960s American films